Bones of the Dragon is a fantasy novel by American writers Margaret Weis and Tracy Hickman, the first book in the Dragonships series. It was released in hardcover on January 6, 2009. 

American fantasy novels
2009 American novels
Novels by Margaret Weis
Novels by Tracy Hickman
Tor Books books